Break Point may refer to:

Arts and media

Film
 Break Point (film), a 2014 American comedy film directed by Jay Karas.

Television
 Break Point (2021 TV series), a 2021 Indian documentary series
 Break Point (2023 TV series), a 2023 documentary series released by Netflix

Books
 Break Point (novel), a 2002 novel by Rosie Rushton